In English law, provocation was a mitigatory defence to murder which had taken many guises over generations many of which had been strongly disapproved and modified. In closing decades, in widely upheld form, it amounted to proving a reasonable total loss of control as a response to another's objectively provocative conduct sufficient to convert what would otherwise have been murder into manslaughter. It only applied to murder. It was abolished on 4 October 2010 by section 56(1) of the Coroners and Justice Act 2009, but thereby replaced by the superseding—and more precisely worded—loss of control.

The principles
Under section 3 of the Homicide Act 1957 (repealed, see below):

The initial burden was on the defence to raise sufficient evidence of provocation. As a matter of law, the judge would then decide whether to leave the defence to the jury. This did not change the burden of proof which, as in all criminal cases, was on the prosecution to prove the actus reus and mens rea of the offence charged, i.e. murder. The Act changed the common law, which had established some non-exhaustive categories or examples which constituted provocation, including:
 a gross insult followed by assault
 witnessing an attack on a relative or friend
 witnessing an Englishman being unlawfully deprived of his liberty
 a husband discovering his wife in the act of adultery; and
 possibly a father discovering someone committing sodomy on his son (R v Fisher (1837))

The Act provided that provocation could be by anything done or said without it having to be an illegal act and the provoker and the deceased could be third parties. If the accused was provoked, who provoked him was irrelevant.

This section of the Act was repealed on 4 October 2010. It was superseded by sections 54 and 55 of the Coroners and Justice Act 2009 when they came into force on the same date.

The factual limb
This was a subjective test and a pure question of fact, i.e. the evidence had to show that the defendant actually lost his self-control. In R v Duffy, Devlin J. said that

Under normal circumstances, the response to the provocation had to be almost immediate retaliation. If there was a "cooling-off" period, the court would find that the accused should have regained control, making all subsequent actions intentional and therefore murder. In R v Ibrams & Gregory the defendants had been terrorised and bullied by the deceased over a period of time so devised a plan to attack him. There was no evidence of a sudden and temporary loss of self-control as required by Duffy. Even the period of time to fetch a weapon could be sufficient to cool off. In R v Thornton, a woman suffering from "battered woman syndrome" went to the kitchen, took and sharpened a carving knife, and returned to stab her husband. The appeal referred to s3 which required the jury to have regard to "everything both said and done according to the effect which in their opinion it would have on a reasonable man". The appellant argued that instead of considering the final provocation, the jury should have considered the events over the years leading up to the killing. Beldam LJ rejected this, saying:

But in R v Thornton (No 2) after considering new medical evidence, a retrial was ordered and the defendant was convicted of manslaughter on the ground of diminished responsibility. Similarly, in R v Ahluwalia a retrial was ordered. The defendant had poured petrol over her husband and set it alight, causing burns from which he died. When the defence of diminished responsibility on the ground of "battered woman syndrome" was put, she was convicted of manslaughter. In R v Humphreys, the defendant finally lost self-control after years of abuse and stabbed her partner. She pleaded that the final words had been the straw that broke the camel's back. The conviction for murder was held unsafe because the accused's psychiatric condition stemming from the abuse should have been attributed to the reasonable person when the jury considered the application of the objective test.

The reasonable person test
If the jury was satisfied that the defendant was provoked, the test was whether a reasonable person would have acted as the defendant did – an objective test.

It was held in Camplin that the accused's age and sex could be attributed to the reasonable man when the jury considered the defendant's power of self-control. Further, that any characteristic of the accused could be included which the jury considered may affect the gravity of the provocation.

Therefore, the reasonable person had to be endowed with the particular characteristics of the accused. In a number of leading cases, Morhall and Luc Thiet Thuan v R, it was held that the judge should direct the jury to consider whether an ordinary person with ordinary powers of self-control would have reacted to the provocation as the defendant did and that no allowance should be given for any characteristics that might have made him or her more volatile than the ordinary person. These decisions acknowledged, however, that, in addition to age and sex, characteristics which affected the gravity of the provocation to the defendant should be taken into account. In R v Smith the defendant was charged with murder and relied on the defence of provocation, alleging that he had been suffering from serious clinical depression and had been so provoked by the deceased as to lose his self-control. Lord Hoffman held that the test was whether the jury thought that the circumstances were such as to make the loss of self-control sufficiently excusable to reduce the gravity of the offence from murder to manslaughter.

Furthermore, the House held, by a majority, that no distinction should be drawn, when attributing characteristics for the purposes of the objective part of the test imposed by s3 Homicide Act, between their relevance to the gravity of the provocation to a reasonable man and his reaction to it. Account could be taken of a relevant characteristic in relation to the accused's power of self-control, whether or not the characteristic was the object of the provocation. But in HM's AG for Jersey v Holley the Privy Council regarded Smith as wrongly decided, interpreting the Act as setting a purely objective standard. Thus, although the accused's characteristics were to be taken into account when assessing the gravity of the provocation, the standard of self-control to be expected was invariable except for the accused's age and sex. The defendant and the deceased both suffered from chronic alcoholism and had a violent and abusive relationship. The evidence was that the deceased was drunk and taunted him by telling him that she had had sex with another man. The defendant then struck the deceased with an axe which was an accident of availability. Psychiatric evidence was that his consumption of alcohol was involuntary and that he suffered from a number of other psychiatric conditions which, independently of the effects of the alcohol, might have caused the loss of self-control and induced him to kill. Lord Nicholls said:

In R v Faqir Mohammed a cultured Asian man caught a young man leaving his daughter's bedroom window. He immediately killed his daughter by repeatedly stabbing her with a knife. Following the death of his wife five years earlier he suffered from depression, and there was credible evidence that he had a violent temperament and had repeatedly been violent towards his daughters and his wife. Despite the fact that a Privy Council ratio decidendi is only persuasive authority, the Court of Appeal applied it and reinstated the law before Smith. Scott Baker LJ said:

In R v James the court again considered the relationship between the Privy Council decision in Holley and Smith. In his commentary on Holley, Ashworth (2005) said:

Viewing this situation as exceptional, Phillips CJ accepted that the Privy Council decision had indeed overruled the House of Lords, recognising the error that the Lords had made in their earlier interpretation of the law. Rather than follow the strict rules of precedent and send the issue back to the Lords for clarification, the Court of Appeal accepted the de facto situation and recognised Holley as the binding precedent.

Self-induced provocation
In 1973 the Privy Council held in Edwards v R that a blackmailer could not rely on the predictable results of his demands for money when his victim attacked him (a policy decision to prevent a criminal from relying on his own wrongdoing as the cause of the subsequent death).  In R v Johnson, the defendant had become involved in an escalating argument with the deceased and his female companion.  When the victim threatened the defendant with a beer glass, the defendant fatally stabbed him with a knife.  The judge instructed the jury that they were open to find the threatening situation had been self-induced, in which case provocation would not be open as a defence.  The Court of Appeal held that section 3 of the Homicide Act 1957 provided that anything could amount to provocation, including responsive actions provoked by the defendant.  It applied the defence (duly substituting the conviction for that of manslaughter).

The new defence of "loss of control" introduced by the Coroners and Justices Act 2009, specifically excluded self-induced provocation in section 55, subsection 6, a) in terms of "fear of serious violence"  and b) in terms of "a sense of being seriously wronged by a thing done or said " when the "qualifying trigger" was incited "for the purpose of providing an excuse to use violence."

Sentencing
 Note This section deals with the loss of control defence which replaced provocation in 2010.

The Sentencing Council set out a guideline for manslaughter (substituted for charge/finding of murder) by reason of an accepted defence of loss of control. It came in to effect on 1 November 2018.

 The recommended "offence range" is 3 – 20 years custody.
 The maximum is life imprisonment.
 This is a serious specified offence for the purposes of sections 224 and 225(2) (life sentences for serious offences) of the Criminal Justice Act 2003.
 This is an offence listed in Part 1 of Schedule 15B for the purposes of section 224A (life sentence for a second listed offence) and section 226A (extended sentence for certain violent, sexual or terrorism offences) of the Criminal Justice Act 2003.
 The type of manslaughter (and thereby the appropriate guideline) should have been identified prior to sentence.

A nine-stage formula is to be used, for ideal legal compliance. Stage 1, culpability, will set the sentencing "starting point".

Notably the fourth stage is reduction for guilty pleas (such as by a plea bargain); the fifth is dangerousness.  If the actions and/or psychological reports are adverse they may well meet the criteria in Chapter 5 of Part 12 of the Criminal Justice Act 2003 by which it would be appropriate to impose a life sentence (section 224A or section 225) or an extended sentence (section 226A).

References

Further reading 
 Law Commission. Partial Defences to Murder: Overseas Studies Consultation Paper No 173 (Appendices)  on provocation in Australia and India
Gardner. (2003). "The Mark of Responsibility". O.J.L.S. 23(2) 157–171.
Neal & Bagaric. (2003). "Provocation: the Ongoing Subservience of Principle to Tradition".  Journal of Criminal Law  67(3) 237–256.
Oliver. (1999). "Provocation and Non-violent Homosexual Advances". Journal of Criminal Law. 63(6) 586–592.
Thomas. (2003). "Sentencing: Manslaughter – Manslaughter by Reason of Provocation – Manslaughter of Spouse of Partner", Criminal Law Review, June 414-417.
Toczek. (1996). "The Action of the Reasonable Man". New Law Journal 146, 835.
Toczek. (2000). "Self-control and the Reasonable Man". New Law Journal 150, 1222.

External links
 The Reasonable Man Concept Applied in the Partial Defence of Provocation

English criminal law